Events in the year 1743 in Norway.

Incumbents
Monarch: Christian VI

Events
3-11 December - The Great Flood of 1743.

Arts and literature

Births
25 November – Jochum Brinch Lund, merchant (d.1807).

Full date unknown
Ole Rødder, violinist (d.1806).

Deaths

15 April – Eiler Hagerup d.e., bishop (born 1685).
14 September – Georg von Bertouch, composer and military officer (born 1668).

See also

References